A horse of central Inner Mongolia, the Xilingol is a light horse that is used both for riding and for draft purposes. In the 1960s, it was developed by breeding Russian Thoroughbred, Akhal-Teke, Sanhe, and Chinese Mongolian, after which Kabarda and Don breeding were introduced into the breed. The Xilingol stands at 15.2 hands high and come in all solid colors.

References

Horse breeds
Horse breeds originating in China